Ilsandong-gu (literally “Eastern Ilsan district”) is a district in Goyang, Gyeonggi-do, South Korea. Ilsan-gu was divided into Ilsandong-gu and Ilsanseo-gu on May 16, 2005.

Administration
Ilsandong-gu is divided into 11 dong (동, "neighborhoods"):

 Siksa-dong (식사동)
 Jungsan-dong (중산동)
 Pungsan-dong (풍산동)
 Baekseok 1 and 2-dong (백석1~2동)
 Madu 1 and 2-dong (마두1~2동)
 Janghang 1 and 2-dong (장항1~2동)
 Gobong-dong (고봉동) [divided into Jiyeong-dong, Seongseok-dong, Seolmun-dong and Sarihyeon-dong (지영동, 성석동, 설문동, 사리현동)]

Attractions
The National Cancer Center of Korea is located in Ilsan. Ilsan is also home to Lake Park. There are several recreational facilities such as promenade road, bicycle path, inline skating, walking, and a jogging trail that encircles the lake. Lake Park also features a large variety of wild flowers and plants, such as cactus arboretum and botanical gardens. It is the venue for the annual Goyang World Flower Festival and the filming location of Seoul Broadcasting System's drama Star's Lover.

The area surrounding Lake Park is a large and sprawling commercial district, which include the Lotte Department Store, Grand Department Store, Hyundai Department Store, as well as the huge La Festa shopping complex and the Western Dom which hosts hundreds of stores, restaurants, entertainment venues, and bars.  The nightlife in La Festa and Western Dom is also evident as thousands of young people can be seen and businesses are always bustling, especially the bars and nightclubs pounding out loud music until the early morning hours every day.  Ilsan is also the site of an annual electric lights festival. Its dynamic culture and beautiful urban landscape have attracted production of numerous Korean TV shows. As a result, MBC and SBS, two of the three largest television networks, relocated their production centres to Ilsan.

Jeongbalsan Park is located in the center of Ilsan. It is a large residential park which features a large hiking hill with trails, a large Buddhist temple, some historical thatched roof houses, and an outdoor gymnasium.

The Goyang Aram Complex is also located in Ilsan between Lake Park and Jeongbalsan mountain. The theater has 1,887 seats.  It is the only wind-pipe concert hall north of the Han River with more than 1,000 seats.

Education

Ilsandong-gu has 33 schools, including 19 elementary schools, 6 middle schools, 7 high schools, and 1 special school. Baengma (백마) is notable for its hagwons (학원), or cram schools, and many hagwons operate in the region.

Photos

References

External links 
 Ilsandong-gu office website (Eastern Ilsan district) 

Goyang
Districts in Gyeonggi Province